The 2021 TCU Horned Frogs football team represented Texas Christian University during the 2021 NCAA Division I FBS football season. The Horned Frogs played their home games at the Amon G. Carter Stadium in Fort Worth, Texas, and competed in the Big 12 Conference. The team was coached by 21st-year head coach Gary Patterson until he left the program after eight games. He was replaced by special assistant coach Jerry Kill on an interim basis.

Previous season

The Horned Frogs finished the 2020 regular season 6–4 and 5–4 in Big 12 play to finish in fifth in the conference. They were eligible to play in the post season and was invited to play in the 2020 Texas Bowl against Arkansas. The bowl game was later canceled before the game due to the COVID-19 pandemic. The offensive coordinator Sonny Cumbie left the program at the end of the season and was replaced by former coach Doug Meacham.

Schedule

Game summaries

vs. Duquesne

vs. California

at Kansas State

Sources: ESPN box score ESPN team stats

Wildcat Felix Anudike-Uzomah set a new school and Big 12 record six sacks while also tying the NCAA single-game record.  TCU had two opportunities to score inside the 5 yard line, but the Kansas State defense held—the first time for the year that the Horned Frogs did not score while in the red zone.

Kansas State took the lead in the first quarter and held it for the entire game.  TCU managed to pull within 7-3 in the second quarter, but Kansas State made it 14-3 on the next series with a 42-yard run by Deuce Vaughn.

TCU managed a safety and also produced some quality plays, including Kendre Miller on a 61-yard carry to the 2-yard line—but TCU could not complete the final two yards in four plays for a score.  Their only score by the offense was a field goal.  TCU did hold Kansas State scoreless in the third quarter.

On Sunday after the game, TCU fired head coach Gary Patterson and will have Jerry Kill take over on an interim basis.

Rankings

Coaching staff

References

TCU
TCU Horned Frogs football seasons
TCU Horned Frogs football